Dioscorea deltoidea, the Nepal yam, is a species of flowering plant in the family Dioscoreaceae. Its native range is the Himalayas through to south-central China and mainland Southeast Asia. Its tubers contain diosgenin and are harvested by local peoples as a treatment for a variety of conditions, including gastrointestinal disorders and intestinal worms. Tubers are also eaten after boiling, washing, and baking. It grows in forests and humus-rich soils.

References

deltoidea
Flora of Assam (region)
Flora of Bangladesh
Flora of East Himalaya
Flora of India (region)
Flora of Myanmar
Flora of Nepal
Flora of South-Central China
Flora of Thailand
Flora of Tibet
Flora of Vietnam
Flora of West Himalaya
Plants described in 1842